Shazam! Fury of the Gods is a 2023 American superhero film based on the DC Comics character Shazam. Produced by New Line Cinema, DC Studios, the Safran Company, and distributed by Warner Bros. Pictures, it is the sequel to Shazam! (2019) and the 12th installment in the DC Extended Universe (DCEU). The film was directed by David F. Sandberg and written by Henry Gayden and Chris Morgan, and stars Zachary Levi, Asher Angel, Jack Dylan Grazer, Rachel Zegler, Adam Brody, Ross Butler, Meagan Good, Lucy Liu, Djimon Hounsou and Helen Mirren. In the film, Billy Batson / Shazam and his foster siblings fight the Daughters of Atlas.

A sequel to Shazam! began development shortly after that film's release in April 2019, with Gayden returning as writer. Sandberg and Levi (Shazam) were also set to return by that December. The title and rest of the returning cast were confirmed in August 2020, with Zegler, Mirren and Liu cast as the daughters of Atlas in early 2021. Filming began that May in Atlanta, Georgia, and concluded in August.

Shazam! Fury of the Gods premiered at the Fox Village Theater in the Westwood neighborhood of Los Angeles on March 14, 2023, and was theatrically released in the United States on March 17. The film received mixed reviews from critics and has grossed $65 million worldwide.

Plot 
Two years after Thaddeus Sivana's defeat, Hespera and Kalypso, two of the daughters of the Titan Atlas, break into the Acropolis Museum in Athens, Greece to steal the Wizard's broken staff. The duo then take it to the imprisoned Wizard, forcing him to repair the staff and activate its powers.

In Philadelphia, Billy Batson and his "Shazamily" of foster siblings save people on the collapsing Benjamin Franklin Bridge, but are called out for its destruction. The group is drifting apart at home due to their growing up and having personal interests. Billy is worried about being kicked out of the Vasquez family after he turns 18 and ages out of the foster system. In a dream, as Shazam, Billy is warned by the Wizard about Hespera and Kalypso — he and the Shazamily research the Daughters. 

Freddy Freeman, still bullied at school, falls for a new girl named Anne, to whom he shows off his superhero self. Unfortunately, Hespera and Kalypso arrive with the staff and steal Freddy's powers. Anne is revealed to be their youngest sister, Anthea. Billy and the other Shazamily try to save Freddy, but the daughters kidnap him and place a dome around the city, trapping everyone inside. Freddy is imprisoned along with the Wizard in the Gods' Realm. Hespera and Kalypso reveal they want revenge because the Wizard killed their father. 

Meanwhile, the Shazamily enter the Rock of Eternity, where they encounter a sentient pen named "Steve," which they use to draft a letter to Hespera as a negotiation for Freddy's release. Billy meets Hespera, and, while the meeting is initially cordial, she and Kalypso soon fight the Shazamily. Pedro loses his powers during the fight, while Hespera is captured and returned to the Rock. Hespera easily breaks out and steals the Golden Apple, the seed of the Tree of Life. Meanwhile, Freddy and the Wizard try to escape the Gods' Realm with Anthea's help, just as Hespera returns with the apple. However, the Daughters argue as Hespera and Anthea want to use the Apple to revive their realm, while Kalypso wishes to plant it on Earth to conquer it. Freddy steals the apple but is found out, though Billy and the Shazamily show up, and Freddy reacquires his powers.

Billy and the Shazamily emerge with the Wizard in the Vasquez home, where they reveal their secret identities to their foster parents. Kalypso appears with a dragon named Ladon to acquire the Apple. All but Billy lose their powers in the skirmish while Kalypso retrieves the Apple. She intends to plant the Tree on Earth, rather than in the Gods' Realm, planning to terraform the Earth. Kalypso mortally wounds Hespera and depowers Anthea when they object. She later plants the tree at Citizens Bank Park, which spawns monsters that attack the city. Billy, in despair, asks the Wizard to revoke his powers, though the Wizard assures him he is a true hero.

Heeding the Wizard's words, Billy turns into Shazam and flies off to stop Kalypso, while the Shazamily enlist the help of unicorns to fend off the monsters in the city. Meanwhile, Shazam persuades a dying Hespera to help him stop Kalypso. Realizing the dome reacts violently to his lightning, Billy lures Kalypso to the Park while Hespera shrinks the dome to contain them. Billy fights Kalypso and Ladon before killing them both by overloading the staff with electricity, destroying the tree and Kalypso's army with them, at the cost of his own life. 

Anthea brings Billy's grieving family to her kingdom for his funeral as they mourn for him. However, the demigoddess Diana suddenly appears and repairs the staff, imbuing it with her power before using it to revive the Gods' Realm and resurrect Billy, who happily reunites with his family. Billy then uses the staff to restore all of his siblings' powers. The Shazamily fixes their home while Anthea and the Wizard take up residence on Earth.

In a mid-credits scene, Emilia Harcourt and John Economos attempt to recruit Billy on behalf of Amanda Waller to join the Justice Society. In a post-credits scene, a still-incarcerated, now-bearded Sivana encounters Mister Mind once again, infuriated of him abruptly dissappearing for two years, and asks where he has been. Mister Mind informs him that the plan is in progress and that there is one last thing he needs to complete it, and that he has taken so long as he has no wings or legs, and tells Sivana to be patient but Sivana is angry that Mister Mind hasn't begun to enacting their plan yet.

Cast 

 Zachary Levi and Asher Angel as Billy Batson / Shazam:The champion of an ancient wizard, who possesses "the wisdom of Solomon, the strength of Hercules, the stamina of Atlas, the power of Zeus, the courage of Achilles, and the speed of Mercury".
 Jack Dylan Grazer and Adam Brody as Frederick "Freddy" Freeman:Billy's physically disabled foster brother, who is a fan of superheroes. Grazer portrays Freddy's regular form, while Brody portrays his adult superhero form.
 Rachel Zegler as Anthea / Anne: The youngest daughter of Atlas.
 Grace Caroline Currey as Mary Bromfield:Billy's mature and academically-driven older foster sister. Currey also portrays Mary's adult superhero form, replacing Michelle Borth from the first film.
 Ross Butler and Ian Chen as Eugene Choi:Billy's younger foster brother who is an obsessive gamer. Butler portrays Eugene's adult superhero form, while Chen portrays his regular form.
 D. J. Cotrona and Jovan Armand as Pedro Peña:Billy's older foster brother, who is openly gay, shy and sensitive. Cotrona portrays Pedro's adult superhero form, while Armand portrays his regular form.
 Meagan Good and Faithe Herman as Darla Dudley:Billy's good-natured younger foster sister. Good portrays Darla's adult superhero form, while Herman portrays her regular form.
 Lucy Liu as Kalypso: The middle daughter of Atlas.
 Djimon Hounsou as Shazam: The last surviving member of the Council of Wizards, who bestowed his powers on Billy Batson, after designating the boy as his champion.
 Helen Mirren as Hespera: The oldest daughter of Atlas.

Billy's foster family also includes Marta Milans and Cooper Andrews as Rosa and Victor Vásquez, the foster parents of Billy and his siblings. Reprising their DCEU roles in the film while uncredited, Gal Gadot appears as Diana Prince / Wonder Woman, alongside Jennifer Holland as Emilia Harcourt and Steve Agee as John Economos in the mid-credits scene, and Mark Strong as Dr. Thaddeus Sivana and director David F. Sandberg as the voice of Mister Mind in the post-credits scene. Sandberg also cameos as a civilian who is attacked by one of Kalypso's monsters. Rizwan Manji, who portrayed Jamil in the DCEU television series Peacemaker, appears as an unnamed docent. P. J. Byrne briefly appears as Dr. Dario Bava, a pediatrician whom Billy confused as a therapist, while Diedrich Bader briefly appears as Mr. Geckle, a school teacher. Sandberg's wife Lotta Losten, who previously portrayed Dr. Lynn Crosby in the first film, cameos as a nurse who is saved by Shazam. Michael Gray, who portrayed Billy Batson in the 1970s television series, makes a brief cameo as a man on the street. Natalia Safran, wife of producer Peter Safran, cameos as a driver with kittens. CNN news anchor Wolf Blitzer makes a cameo appearance as himself.

Production

Development 
With the successful opening of Shazam! in April 2019, Henry Gayden was revealed to be returning to write the script for a sequel. Director David F. Sandberg and producer Peter Safran were also expected to return. According to Sandberg, the plot point of Fawcett City, Philadelphia being trapped under a dome was inspired by The Simpsons Movie (2007). Later that month, Michelle Borth, who portrayed the adult superhero form of Mary Bromfield in the first film, said she signed a five-picture deal for the role and was expected to return for at least one sequel. Zachary Levi confirmed in June that he was returning to star as Shazam in the sequel, and revealed that writing had begun ahead of a planned filming start in mid-2020. Sandberg and much of the first film's crew were confirmed to return in December 2019, when New Line Cinema and Warner Bros. Pictures scheduled the sequel for release on April 1, 2022. This was delayed in April 2020 to November 4, 2022. due to the COVID-19 pandemic. In October 2020, the release date was once again shifted to June 2, 2023. Later release dates were December 16, 2022 and December 21, 2022. In August 2022, the final release date of March 17, 2023 was announced.

Pre-production 
In June 2020, Marta Milans confirmed that she would reprise her role as foster mother Rosa Vásquez from the first film, and revealed that filming had been delayed by the pandemic. The film's title was revealed to be Shazam! Fury of the Gods during the virtual DC FanDome event in August 2020, with returning cast members confirmed including Asher Angel as teenager Billy Batson and Levi as his adult superhero counterpart, Jack Dylan Grazer as Frederick "Freddy" Freeman and Adam Brody as his adult counterpart, Faithe Herman as Darla Dudley and Meagan Good as her adult counterpart, Grace Fulton as Mary Bromfield, Ian Chen as Eugene Choi and Ross Butler as his adult counterpart, and Jovan Armand as Pedro Peña with D. J. Cotrona as his adult counterpart. The next month, Levi said filming would begin in early 2021.

The film's release was delayed again in October 2020, to June 2, 2023. The following month, Mark Strong said he was waiting to hear if he would be returning as Dr. Thaddeus Sivana in the sequel. In January 2021, Good said filming would begin that May, and Rachel Zegler was cast in an undisclosed "key role" the next month. Following her exhaustive filming schedule for Maria in West Side Story (2021), Zegler booked a meeting with the DCEU casting director Rich Delia, who was thinking about her for Kara Zor-El / Supergirl in The Flash (2023). Zegler lost out to Sasha Calle, but Delia told her that he thought that she could audition for Anthea in the Shazam sequel. During the COVID-19 pandemic, Zegler read on for the role through Zoom with Sandberg and Dylan Grazer, doing a chemistry test with the latter, who was instrumental in her casting due to Safran giving him the option to choose and Dylan Grazer chose Zegler out of admiration for her work in the West Side Story (1961) remake. Safran was producing the film through his company the Safran Company, while Geoff Johns was also set to produce. Johns was ultimately credited as an executive producer. In March, Helen Mirren was cast as Hespera, a daughter of Atlas, with Zegler reported to be playing Hespera's sister, Anthea. Lucy Liu was cast as Kalypso, another daughter of Atlas, the next month. Strong said in May that he would not appear in the sequel, and Cooper Andrews was confirmed to reprise his role as foster father Víctor Vásquez from the first film.

Chris Morgan contributed to the film's script. Early during the film's development, Sandberg wanted to bring back Mister Mind, a villainous character teased in the mid-credits scene of the first film whom Sandberg voiced, for the sequel in a bigger role, but his inclusion was ultimately dropped due to it requiring too much of the film's runtime, aside that he had to drop several other elements to not "overstuff" the film. In addition to bringing Gal Gadot back as Diana Prince / Wonder Woman, Sandberg initially planned to have cameo appearances of Kal-El / Clark Kent / Superman and Bruce Wayne / Batman by showing Superman unsuccessfully trying to break the dome while Batman just stands there and looks at Superman.

Filming 
Principal photography began on May 26, 2021, in Atlanta, Georgia, with Gyula Pados serving as cinematographer. Production on the film was delayed from an initial mid-2020 start due to the COVID-19 pandemic. In June, Sandberg revealed that Fulton was also portraying the adult superhero form of Mary in the film, replacing Borth, with Fulton's hair and makeup adjusted for the superhero version. A month later, set photos revealed that Djimon Hounsou would be reprising his role as the wizard Shazam. Filming concluded on August 31, 2021.

Post-production 
In March 2022, Warner Bros. adjusted its release schedule due to the impacts of COVID-19 on the workload of visual effects vendors. The Flash and Aquaman and the Lost Kingdom were moved from 2022 to 2023 to allow time for their visual effects work to be completed, while Shazam! Fury of the Gods was moved up to Aquaman and the Lost Kingdom previous release date of December 16, 2022, because it would be ready for release earlier. In April, the film's release date was pushed back five days to December 21 to avoid competition with Avatar: The Way of Water. Rizwan Manji was revealed to be appearing as an unnamed character in July 2022. Manji was suggested for the role by Safran, who also produced the DCEU television series Peacemaker in which Manji portrayed Jamil. Sandberg approved the casting, despite the series being set in the same universe as the film, because he thought Manji only had a small role in Peacemaker. He was surprised to learn that Manji has a significant role and appears in the opening title sequence of the series. Peacemaker creator James Gunn suggested that Manji's character in Fury of the Gods could be Jamil's brother. In August, after WarnerMedia merged with Discovery, Inc. to form Warner Bros. Discovery, the studio delayed the film to March 17, 2023 (again taking Aquaman and the Lost Kingdom previous release date), to help spread out the marketing and distribution costs for its feature films. This also moved Fury of the Gods away from Avatar: The Way of Water. By the start of November, Sandberg confirmed that the final cut was complete and ready for release.

The final wave of the film's marketing campaign reveals Gal Gadot's cameo appearance as Diana Prince / Wonder Woman, reprising her role from prior DCEU. Sandberg was surprised and upset by this reveal, as he had intended the cameo to be a surprise. The film's mid-credits scene sees Jennifer Holland and Steve Agee reprise their DCEU roles as Emilia Harcourt and John Economos, respectively. The scene originally included members of the Justice Society of America from Black Adam, but Safran was forced to bring in Holland and Agee after this plan fell apart. Strong and Sanberg ultimately reprise their roles in the film's post-credits scene.

Music 

In June 2022, Sandberg revealed that Benjamin Wallfisch was unable to return as composer from the first film due to scheduling conflicts, with Christophe Beck replacing him for the sequel and already beginning work by then. A single titled "Shazam! Fury of the Gods (Main Title Theme)" was released as a digital single by WaterTower Music on February 23, 2023, and the soundtrack album was released on March 10.

Marketing 
Sandberg promoted the sequel during a virtual panel at the August 2020 DC FanDome event, announcing the film's title and returning cast. In June 2021, after a week of filming, Sandberg released a short clip featuring Levi in his new costume for the film; this came after several set photos of the costume were leaked during that week. To get ahead of further costume leaks, Sandberg released an image of Levi, Brody, Good, Currey, Butler, and Cotrona in their new superhero costumes for the film at the end of the month. Behind-the-scenes footage and concept art from the film was revealed during the 2021 DC FanDome event in October, with io9 Rob Bricken and Collider Gregory Lawrence both expressing excitement at the new cast members, characters, locations, and mythology revealed in the footage. Levi, Angel, Grazer, and Mirren promoted the film at Warner Bros.' CinemaCon panel in April 2022, revealing new footage from the film. The film was also promoted at San Diego Comic-Con in July, where the first trailer was released.

In March 14, Skittles partnered with Warner Bros. and DC Studios to create commercials for the film. McFarlane Toys also partnered to create promotional toys for the film, including action figures and dolls.

Release 

Shazam! Fury of the Gods premiered at Fox Village Theater in Hollywood on March 14, 2023, and was released by Warner Bros. Pictures in the United States on March 17, 2023.

It was originally set for release on April 1, 2022, before being delayed to November 4, 2022, and then to June 2, 2023, due to the COVID-19 pandemic. It was then moved up to December 16, 2022, as it was ready for release sooner than other DC films delayed by the pandemic. That date was previously given to Aquaman and the Lost Kingdom. The release date was pushed back five days to December 21 in April 2022 to avoid competition with 20th Century Studios' Avatar: The Way of Water, before being moved to Aquaman and the Lost Kingdom date again (March 2023) in August 2022 when Warner Bros. Discovery was trying to spread out marketing and distribution costs. This meant IMAX screens occupied by Avatar would be available for Shazam!.

Reception

Box office 
, Shazam! Fury of the Gods has grossed $30.1 million in the United States and Canada, and $34.6 million in other territories, for a worldwide total of $64.7 million.

In the United States and Canada, Shazam! Fury of the Gods was initially projected to gross $35–40 million from 4,071 theaters in its opening weekend. The film made $11.7 million (including $3.4 million from Thursday night previews), lowering weekend estimates to $30 million. It went on to debut to $30.5 million, topping the box office but marking a 43% drop from the first film's opening weekend ($53.5 million) and the third-worst of the DCEU (though the two lower films, The Suicide Squad and Wonder Woman 1984, had their releases affected by the COVID-19 pandemic and were simultaneously released on HBO Max). Boxoffice Pros Shawn Robbins called the debut "a soft start, there's no other way to put it," noting the recent underperformances of other comic book films. The Hollywood Reporter called the domestic opening "one of the worst starts for a major Hollywood superhero film" and also lamented the film's $35 million international opening from 78 countries (including "bombing" in China with $4.4 million). A.V. Club noted that it premiered during a weekend which saw other films experience dull box office numbers as well.

Critical response 
  Audiences surveyed by CinemaScore gave the film an average grade of "B+" on an A+ to F scale, while those polled by PostTrak gave it a 78% positive score, with 64% saying they would definitely recommend it.

Future 
In January 2023, DC Studios CEO James Gunn stated that he was interested in retaining Levi, alongside other select DCEU cast members, for the upcoming DC Universe (DCU), which is intended to succeed and soft reboot the DCEU. However, Sandberg stated in February 2023 that Levi's future in the DCU could depend on the reception of Fury of the Gods.

Notes

References

External links 
 
 

2020s American films
2020s English-language films
2020s superhero films
2020s teen comedy films
2023 action comedy films
2023 fantasy films
4DX films
American action comedy films
American fantasy action films
American fantasy comedy films
American sequel films
American superhero comedy films
American teen comedy films
DC Extended Universe films
Films about deities
Films about dragons
Films about magic
Films about rapid human age change
Films about size change
Films about wizards
Films based on classical mythology
Films directed by David F. Sandberg
Films postponed due to the COVID-19 pandemic
Films produced by Peter Safran
Films scored by Christophe Beck
Films set in Athens
Films set in Philadelphia
Films shot in Atlanta
Films with screenplays by Chris Morgan
Films with screenplays by Henry Gayden
IMAX films
New Line Cinema films
Resurrection in film
ScreenX films
Seven Bucks Productions films
Shazam! (film series)
Superhero crossover films
Teen superhero comedy films
Warner Bros. films